Pilgrim Congregational Church is a historic Congregational church building at 909 Main Street in Worcester, Massachusetts.  The brick Romanesque Revival building was constructed in 1887 to a design by local architect Stephen Earle.  The buildings windows and other details are trimmed in sandstone, and a tower with projecting rounded corners rises from one corner.  It features an open belfry with round-arch openings and is capped by a steeply pitched roof, with decorative finials at the corners.

The church was listed on the National Register of Historic Places in 1980.

See also
National Register of Historic Places listings in southwestern Worcester, Massachusetts
National Register of Historic Places listings in Worcester County, Massachusetts

References

External links
Church web site

Churches in Worcester, Massachusetts
Churches on the National Register of Historic Places in Massachusetts
Churches completed in 1887
19th-century churches in the United States
Stone churches in Massachusetts
National Register of Historic Places in Worcester, Massachusetts